Giant asian pangolin (Manis palaeojavanica ["ancient Javan pangolin"]), is an extinct species of pangolin (from genus Manis) that was native to Asia.

In 1926, E. Dubois described the bones of M. palaeojavanica discovered in Java. Later, Lord Medway excavated another set of bones at the Niah Caves in Malaysia. In 1960, D. A. Hoojier identified these bones as that of an extinct species. Using carbon dating, the Niah Caves bones were determined to be 42,000–47,000 years old.

M. palaeojavanica is one of the only known fossils to be found nearly complete of the pangolin species, due to their armour-like scales that protected their bodies when they were alive.

References 

†
Prehistoric mammals of Asia
Prehistoric pangolins